Anoteropsis montana is a species of wolf spider endemic to New Zealand. It was first formally named in 2002.

References

Lycosidae
Spiders described in 2002
Endemic spiders of New Zealand